Gmina Ostrówek may refer to either of the following rural administrative districts in Poland:
Gmina Ostrówek, Lublin Voivodeship
Gmina Ostrówek, Łódź Voivodeship